Xyleborus is by far the largest ambrosia beetle genus in the tribe Xyleborini, with over 500 species.

Xyleborus nowadays includes a number of formerly independent genera. In addition, the genera Coptoborus, Cryptoxyleborus and Euwallacea are often included here, too; this may be correct, as they seem to be closely related. Less often, Ambrosiodmus, Premnobius and Xyleborinus are included in Xyleborus, but they seem to be well distinct; Premnobius might even not belong to the Xyleborini at all.

The different species can be best differentiated by the gallery burrows they build and the tree species they infest. A significant member, X. dispar, causes pear blight.

Selected species

 Xyleborus affinis Eichhoff, 1868
 Xyleborus atratus Eichhoff, 1875
 Xyleborus californicus Wood, 1975 - may belong in Cyclorhipidion
 Xyleborus celsus Eichhoff, 1868
 Xyleborus cryptographus (Ratzeburg, 1837)
 Xyleborus dispar (Fabricius, 1792)
 Xyleborus dryographus (Ratzeburg, 1837)
 Xyleborus eurygraphus (Ratzeburg, 1837)
 Xyleborus ferrugineus (Fabricius, 1801)
 Xyleborus glabratus Eichhoff, 1877
 Xyleborus horridus Eichhoff, 1869
 Xyleborus impressus Eichhoff, 1868
 Xyleborus intrusus Blandford, 1898
 Xyleborus inurbanus (Broun, 1880)
 Xyleborus monographus (Fabricius, 1792)
 Xyleborus obesus LeConte, 1868
 Xyleborus pelliculosus Eichhoff, 1878 - may belong in Cyclorhipidion
 Xyleborus perforans (Wollaston, 1857)
 Xyleborus pfeilii (Ratzeburg, 1837)
 Xyleborus planicollis Zimmermann, 1868
 Xyleborus pubescens Zimmermann, 1868
 Xyleborus sayi (Hopkins, 1915)
 Xyleborus similis Ferrari, 1867
 Xyleborus viduus Eichhoff, 1878
 Xyleborus volvulus (Fabricius, 1775)
 Xyleborus xylographus (Say, 1826)

See also
 List of Xyleborus species

Footnotes

References 
  (2004): PEET Xyleborini - Xyleborus species list. Retrieved 2008-JUL-08.

Scolytinae